Bernard Donaghey (23 December 1882 – 1 July 1916), sometimes known as Barney Donaghey, was an Irish professional footballer, who played as an inside forward in the Football League for Burnley and Manchester United. He also played in the Scottish League for Hibernian and in his native Ireland for Derry Celtic (four spells), Ulster, Belfast Celtic and Glentoran. Donaghey was capped by Ireland at international level and represented the Irish League.

Personal life 
Donaghey was a Catholic and was married. Prior to the First World War, Donaghey was a reservist in the British Army and in early 1915, during the second year of the war, he enlisted as a private in the Royal Inniskilling Fusiliers. He saw action at Gallipoli and was wounded in the head by shrapnel and evacuated to a hospital in Tanta, Egypt. After being deployed to the Western Front in 1916, Donaghey was killed on the first day on the Somme, during his battalion's attack on German trench lines and the Y-Ravine strongpoint, south of Beaumont-Hamel. His body was never recovered and he is commemorated on the Thiepval Memorial.

Honours 
Derry Celtic
 North West Senior Cup (2): 1900–01, 1901–02

Career statistics

References

External links
Profile at MUFCInfo.com

1882 births
1916 deaths
Sportspeople from Derry (city)
Irish association footballers (before 1923)
Glentoran F.C. players
Manchester United F.C. players
Burnley F.C. players
English Football League players
British Army personnel of World War I
British military personnel killed in the Battle of the Somme
Pre-1950 IFA international footballers
Hibernian F.C. players
Association football inside forwards
Scottish Football League players
Irish League representative players
NIFL Premiership players
Derry Celtic F.C. players
Ulster F.C. players
Belfast Celtic F.C. players
Dumbarton Harp F.C. players
Royal Inniskilling Fusiliers soldiers